Āryabhata's sine table is a set of twenty-four numbers  given in the astronomical treatise Āryabhatiya composed by the fifth century  Indian mathematician and astronomer  Āryabhata (476–550 CE),  for the computation of the half-chords of a certain set of arcs of a circle. The set of numbers appears in verse 12 in Chapter 1 Dasagitika of Aryabhatiya. It is not a table in the modern sense of a mathematical table; that is, it is not a set of numbers arranged into rows and columns.  Āryabhaṭa's table is also not a set of values of the trigonometric sine function in a conventional sense; it is a table of the first differences of the values of trigonometric sines expressed in arcminutes, and because of this the table is also referred to as Āryabhaṭa's table of sine-differences.

Āryabhaṭa's table was the first sine table ever constructed in the history of mathematics. The now lost tables of Hipparchus (c. 190 BC – c. 120 BC) and Menelaus (c. 70–140 CE) and those of Ptolemy (c. AD 90 – c. 168) were all tables of chords and not of half-chords.
Āryabhaṭa's table remained as the standard sine table of ancient India. There were continuous attempts to improve the accuracy of this table. These endeavors culminated in the eventual discovery of the power series expansions of the sine and cosine functions by Madhava of Sangamagrama (c. 1350 – c. 1425), the founder of the Kerala school of astronomy and mathematics, and the tabulation of a sine table by Madhava with values accurate to seven or eight decimal places.

Some historians of mathematics have argued that the sine table given in Āryabhaṭiya was an adaptation of earlier such tables constructed by mathematicians and astronomers of ancient Greece. David Pingree, one of America's foremost historians of the exact sciences in antiquity, was an exponent of such a view. Assuming this hypothesis, G. J. Toomer writes, "Hardly any documentation exists for the earliest arrival of Greek astronomical models in India, or for that matter what those models would have looked like. So it is very difficult to ascertain the extent to which what has come down to us represents transmitted knowledge, and what is original with Indian scientists. ... The truth is probably a tangled mixture of both."

The table

In modern notations

The values encoded in Āryabhaṭa's Sanskrit verse can be decoded using the numerical scheme explained in Āryabhaṭīya, and the decoded numbers are listed in the table below. In the table, the angle measures relevant to Āryabhaṭa's sine table are listed in the second column. The third column contains the list the numbers contained in the Sanskrit verse given above in Devanagari script. For the convenience of users unable to read Devanagari, these word-numerals are reproduced in the fourth column in ISO 15919 transliteration. The next column contains these numbers in the Hindu-Arabic numerals. Āryabhaṭa's numbers are the first differences in the values of sines. The corresponding value of sine (or more precisely, of jya) can be obtained by summing up the differences up to that difference. Thus the value of jya corresponding to
18° 45′ is the sum 225 + 224 + 222 + 219 + 215 = 1105. For assessing the accuracy of Āryabhaṭa's computations, the modern values of jyas are given in the last column of the table.

In the Indian mathematical tradition, the sine ( or jya) of an angle is not a ratio of numbers. It is the length of a certain line segment, a certain half-chord. The radius of the base circle is basic parameter for the construction of such tables. Historically, several tables have been constructed using different values for this parameter. Āryabhaṭa has chosen the number 3438 as the value of radius of the base circle for the computation of his sine table.  The rationale of the choice of this parameter is the idea of measuring the circumference of a circle in angle measures. In astronomical computations distances are measured in degrees, minutes, seconds, etc. In this measure, the circumference of a circle is 360° = (60 × 360) minutes = 21600 minutes. The radius of the circle, the measure of whose circumference is 21600 minutes, is 21600 / 2π minutes. Computing this using the value π = 3.1416 known to Aryabhata one gets the radius of the circle as 3438 minutes approximately. Āryabhaṭa's sine table is based on this value for the radius of the base circle. It has not yet been established who is the first ever to use this value for the base radius. But Aryabhatiya is the earliest surviving text containing a reference to this basic constant.

Āryabhaṭa's computational method

The second section of Āryabhaṭiya, titled Ganitapādd, a contains a stanza indicating a method for the computation of the sine table. There are several ambiguities in correctly interpreting the meaning of this verse. For example, the following is a translation of the verse given by Katz wherein the words in square brackets are insertions of the translator and not translations of texts in the verse.
 "When the second half-[chord] partitioned is less than the first half-chord, which is [approximately equal to] the [corresponding] arc, by a certain amount, the remaining [sine-differences] are less [than the previous ones] each by that amount of that divided by the first half-chord."

This may be referring to the fact that the second derivative of the sine function is equal to the negative of the sine function.

See also
 Madhava's sine table
 Bhaskara I's sine approximation formula

References

Trigonometry
Indian mathematics